Iborfia is a village in Zala County, Hungary.

The village had its golden age in the Medieval ages, but since then, the population of the village started to decline, as the people moved away from the village. In 2012, Iborfia had a population of 9 people. Iborfia is the smallest village in Hungary with municipality.

Political life 
The last elections in Iborfia were held in 2019. 13 citizens were allowed to vote and voter turnout was 100%. The mayor became József Lakatos, the previous mayor of Iborfia. Lakatos got 9 votes, and the other candidate, Rózsa Ábrahám got 4 votes. In total, 5 people took part in the elections, so it's officially the 38% of the citizens.

Gallery

References

External links 
 Street map 

Populated places in Zala County